The Disappearance of Kevin Johnson is a 1996 American mockumentary Written and directed by Francis Megahy. It premiered in January 1996 at the Slamdance Film Festival in the United States and later was released on July 25, 1997 in the United Kingdom.
This marked Dudley Moore's last live-action role before his death.

Storyline
The Disappearance of Kevin Johnson is about on the unexplained disappearance of a fictitious wealthy British film producer, Kevin Johnson, who is dealing in sex, lies and blackmail in Hollywood.

Cast 

 Pierce Brosnan as Pierce Brosnan
 James Coburn as James Coburn
 Dudley Moore as Dudley Moore
 Alexander Folk as Police Detective
 Bridget Baiss as Gayle Hamilton
 Carl Sundstrom as Security Guard
 Michael Brandon as Jeff Littman
 Keely Sims as Leela Kerr
 Hector Elias as Ramon Garcia
 John Hillard as Ricky Ryan
 Heather Stephens as Rhonda
 Rick Peters as Willis Stevens
 Ian Ogilvy as Gary
 Michael Laskin as Bill Rackman
 Charlotte Brosnan as Amy
 Brett Baker as Grant
 Guy Siner as Fred Barratt
 Richard Neil as Larry Hillman
 Richard Beymer as Chad Leary
 Timothy Omundson as Nick Ferretti
 Michael Cooke as Judd Ramberg
 Rachael Harris as Il Fornaio Waitress
 Jayson Kalani as Le Petit Four Waiter
 Frederika Kesten as Fitness Trainer
 Eric Da Re as Apartment Manager
 Connie Blankenship as Lisa
 Katherine LaNasa as Cathy
 Stoney Jackson as Julian
 Madison Clarke 	
 Valarie Rae Miller as Rudi
 Scott Coffey as Video Engineer
 Kari Wuhrer as Kristi Wilson
 John Solari as Captain Hammond

References

External links
 
 

1996 films
American mockumentary films
Films about Hollywood, Los Angeles
American independent films
1996 comedy films
British independent films
1990s American films
1990s British films